The men's 10 kilometres walk was a track and field athletics event held as part of the Athletics at the 1912 Summer Olympics programme.  It was the second appearance of racewalking, which had debuted at the previous games with the 10 mile and 3500 metre walks.  The 10 kilometre was the only racewalking event in 1912. The competition was held on Monday, July 8, 1912, and on Thursday, July 11, 1912. Twenty-three racewalkers from twelve nations competed. NOCs could enter up to 12 athletes.

Records

These were the standing world and Olympic records (in hours) prior to the 1912 Summer Olympics.

Results

Semifinals

Both semi-finals were held on Monday, July 8, 1912.

Semifinal 1

Semifinal 2

Final

The final was held on Thursday, July 11, 1912.

References

Sources
 
 

Athletics at the 1912 Summer Olympics
Racewalking at the Olympics